On 4 March 1994 the Human Rights Council passed Resolution 1994/45 on the question of integrating the rights of women into the human rights mechanisms of the United Nations and the elimination of violence against women. This Resolution established the mandate of the "Special Rapporteur on Violence Against Women its causes and consequences".

Mandate 
The special rapporteur is mandated to seek and receive information on violence against women, recommend ways to eliminate violence against women at national, regional and intersectionality levels, and work collaboratively with the other United Nations human rights mechanisms.

Country visits 
The special rapporteur is mandated to carry out country visits, often in conjunction with other special rapporteurs, independent experts or working groups.

Reports to the Human Rights Council
Each year the Special Rapporteur provides a written report to the Human Rights Council outlining the activities undertaken and themes analyzed.

Post-holders
Radhika Coomaraswamy (1994–2003)
Yakin Ertürk (2003–2009)
Rashida Manjoo (2009–2015)
 (2015–2021)
Reem Alsalem (2021–present)

References

Further reading

Violence against women